Ulrich von Sax (born before 1204; died 23 September 1220) was Abbot of Saint Gall from 1204 until his death.

Life 
Ulrich descended from the House of Sax who had property in eastern Switzerland. He was the son of Albrecht von Sax. After his studies in Paris and Bologna, he became portarius (en. "doorman") in Saint Gall and was elected abbot on 18 December 1204. Ulrich probably received the jura regalia from King Philip. He supported his brother Heinrich in his battle against Hugo I of Montfort. Ulrich awarded his brother Heinrich the bailiwick over the abbey, which we had accroached after Philip's death. However, after Otto IV had established himself as king, Ulrich's brother had to release the bailiwick again. In 1208, a dispute arose with Werner von Staufen, the Bishop of Konstanz, concerning Castle Rheineck. The dispute ended with Ulrich's defeat at Breitfeld. The chapel on the former battle field commemorates the bloodshed.

When Frederick II from the Hohenstaufen family moved to Germany in 1212, Ulrich met him and accompanied him to Basel. From then on, he is often found in proximity to Frederick. Ulrich was in charge of Frederick's legation to Pope Innocent III who assigned him the right of wearing the mitre. In 1217, Honorius III endowed him with the right to mitre and ring. Several times, Ulrich was appointed referee by the Pope in church disputes. He expanded the abbey's rule. Together with his brother Heinrich, he built Clanx Castle and he also displayed extensive construction activity in Saint Gall by building a maternity home for poor women. Ulrich was preparing to go to Italy with Frederick II, when he died of a fever in 1220.

References 
 Bless-Grabher, Magdalen. 2011: "Ulrich von Sax". Historisches Lexikon der Schweiz.
 Duft, Johannes, Anton Gössi, and Werner Vogler: Die Abtei St. Gallen. Abriß der Geschichte, Kurzbiographien der Äbte, das stift-sanktgallische Offizialat. Verlag am Klosterhof, St. Gallen 1986.
 Gössi, Anton: St. Gallen – Äbte: Ulrich von Sax, 1204-1220. In: Helvetia Sacra. III: Die Orden mit Benediktinerregel. 2/1: Frühe Klöster, die Benediktiner und Benediktinerinnen in der Schweiz. Francke Verlag, Bern 1986, p. 1296–98.

External links 
 
 Ulrich von Sax on the website of the Stiftsarchiv St. Gallen.

12th-century births
1220 deaths

Year of birth unknown
Abbots of Saint Gall